Joo Hyeon-woo (born 3 November 1990) is a South Korean footballer who plays as midfielder for FC Anyang in K League 2.

Career
He was selected by Gwangju FC in the 2015 K League draft.

References

External links

1990 births
Living people
Association football midfielders
South Korean footballers
Gwangju FC players
Seongnam FC players
K League 1 players
K League 2 players